Mohammad Esmaeili (born 1960) is an Iranian conservative politician.

Esmaeili was born in Mianeh. He is a member of the 9th Islamic Consultative Assembly from the electorate of Zanjan and Tarom with Mohsen Alimardani. Esmaeili won with 89,614 (44.13%) votes.

References

People from Mianeh
Deputies of Zanjan and Tarom
Living people
1960 births
Members of the 9th Islamic Consultative Assembly